Vittorio Leonardo (25 November 1938) is an Italian colorist of some famous Franco-Belgian comics series. He worked for Spirou magazine and founded the Studio Leonardo, which continued his work.

Biography
Vittorio Leonardo was born in Naples, Italy, in 1938. He left his motherland for Belgium in 1947. After various graphic experiences (charcoal, models, oil paintings), he finally dedicated himself to the comic strip. He met Morris and kept in touch with him.

With the help of Morris, but also Franquin, Peyo and Remacle, Leonardo created the comics series Barbotine which allowed him to be hired by Spirou magazine. He took over Hultrasson in 1973, and he created Superdog and Bardolino. He also wrote some scenarios, among them Boule et Bill. Hired by Morris' Lucky Productions, he is entrusting the drawing of some Rantanplan albums, published each week in Télé Star from 1993. He specially contributed to the albums Bêtisier 3, Bêtisier 5, Les Cerveaux, Bêtisier 4, and Le Grand Voyage, written by Bob de Groot.

Studio Leonardo
Studio Leonardo colors a large part of the comics series published in Spirou. They use computer systems developed by Leonardo and his son, Jourdan. Their colleagues Studio Cerise, also working for Spirou, mainly color manually.

Bibliography as colorist 
 Steven Strong (1 album)
 Boule et Bill (4 albums)	  
 Gaston (5 albums)	  
 Isabelle (4 album)
 Lucky Luke (22 albums)
 Marsupilami (4 albums)
 Natacha (4 albums)
 La Patrouille des Castors
 Rantanplan (17)
 The Smurfs (3 albums)
 Spirou et Fantasio
 Yoko Tsuno (22 albums)

References

 La Couture city website 
 Vittorio Leonardo on Bdtheque
 Studio Leonardo on Bdtheque
 Leonardo on bdoubliées

External links
 Spirou magazine official website

1947 births
Living people
Italian comics artists
Belgian people of Italian descent